Zhou Qinzhi (23 November 1927 – 7 June 2022) was a Chinese engineer, and an academician of the Chinese Academy of Engineering. He was one of the founders of fluid bearing in China.

Biography
Zhou was born in Shanghai, on 23 November 1927, while his ancestral home is in Shangyu District of Shaoxing, Zhejiang. In 1950, he graduated from China Industrial and Commercial College. He was a professor at Donghua University and senior engineer at Shanghai Machine Tool Works.

On 7 June 2022, he died from an illness in Shanghai, at the age of 94.

Honours and awards
 1995 Member of the Chinese Academy of Engineering (CAE)

References

1927 births
2022 deaths
Engineers from Shanghai
Academic staff of Donghua University
Members of the Chinese Academy of Engineering